Senator Middleton may refer to:

Andrew C. Middleton (1824–1909), New York State Senate
Clyde Middleton (1928–2019), Kentucky State Senate
Henry Middleton (governor) (1770–1846), South Carolina State Senate
Henry Middleton (1717–1784), South Carolina State Senate
Thomas M. Middleton (born 1945), Maryland State Senate